Kerala is a state on the Malabar Coast of India. It was formed on 1 November 1956, following the passage of the States Reorganisation Act, by combining Malayalam-speaking regions of the erstwhile regions of Cochin, Malabar, South Canara, and Thiruvithamkoor. It is bordered by Karnataka to the north and northeast, Tamil Nadu to the east and south, and the Lakshadweep Sea to the west. With 33 million inhabitants as per the 2011 census, Kerala is the 13th-largest Indian state by population. It is divided into 14 districts with the capital being Thiruvananthapuram. Malayalam is the most widely spoken language and is also the official language of the state.

The Chera dynasty was the first prominent kingdom based in Kerala. The Ay kingdom in the deep south and the Ezhimala kingdom in the north formed the other kingdoms in the early years of the Common Era (CE). The region had been a prominent spice exporter since 3000 BCE. In the 15th century, the spice trade attracted Portuguese traders to Kerala, and paved the way for European colonisation of India. At the time of Indian independence movement in the early 20th century, there were two major princely states in Kerala: Thiruvithamkoor and Cochin. They united to form the state of Thiru-Kochi in 1949. The Malabar region, in the northern part of Kerala, had been a part of the Madras province of British India, which later became a part of the Madras State post-independence. After the States Reorganisation Act, 1956, the modern-day state of Kerala was formed by merging the Malabar district of Madras State (excluding Gudalur taluk of Nilgiris district, Lakshadweep Islands, Topslip, the Attappadi Forest east of Anakatti), the taluk of Kasaragod (now Kasaragod District) in South Canara, and the erstwhile state of Thiru-Kochi (excluding four southern taluks of Kanyakumari district, and Shenkottai taluks).

Kerala has the lowest positive population growth rate in India, 3.44%; the highest Human Development Index (HDI), 0.784 in 2018 (0.712 in 2015); the highest literacy rate, 96.2% in the 2018 literacy survey conducted by the National Statistical Office, India; the highest life expectancy, 77.3 years; and the highest sex ratio, 1,084 women per 1,000 men. Kerala is the second-least impoverished state in India according to the Annual Report of Reserve Bank of India published in 2013. Kerala is the second-most urbanised major state in the country with 47.7% urban population according to the 2011 Census of India. The state topped in the country to achieve the Sustainable Development Goals according to the annual report of NITI Aayog published in 2019. The state has the highest media exposure in India with newspapers publishing in nine languages, mainly Malayalam and sometimes English. Hinduism is practised by more than half of the population, followed by Islam and Christianity.

The tertiary sector contributes around 65% to state's GSVA, while the primary sector contributes only 8%. The state has witnessed significant emigration, especially to the Arab states of the Persian Gulf during the Gulf Boom of the 1970s and early 1980s, and its economy depends significantly on remittances from a large Malayali expatriate community. The production of pepper and natural rubber contributes significantly to the total national output. In the agricultural sector, coconut, tea, coffee, cashew and spices are important. The state is situated between Arabian Sea to the west and Western Ghats mountain ranges to the east. Named as one of the ten paradises of the world by National Geographic Traveler, Kerala is one of the prominent tourist destinations of India, with coconut-lined sandy beaches, backwaters, hill stations, Ayurvedic tourism and tropical greenery as its major attractions.

Etymology
The word Kerala is first recorded as Keralaputo ('son of Chera [s]') in a 3rd-century-BCE rock inscription left by the Maurya emperor Ashoka (274–237 BCE), one of his edicts pertaining to welfare. The word  refers to the oldest known dynasty of Kerala kings and is derived from the Proto-Tamil-Malayalam word for 'lake'.  may stem from the Classical Tamil  'declivity of a hill or a mountain slope' or  'land of the Cheras'.

One folk etymology derives Kerala from the Malayalam word  'coconut tree' and  'land'; thus, 'land of coconuts', which is a nickname for the state used by locals due to the abundance of coconut trees.

The earliest Sanskrit text to mention Kerala as Cherapadha is the late Vedic text Aitareya Aranyaka. Kerala is also mentioned in the Ramayana and the Mahabharata, the two Hindu epics. The Greco-Roman trade map Periplus Maris Erythraei refers to Kerala as Celobotra.

Kerala was alternatively called Malabar in the foreign trade circles. Earlier, the term Malabar had also been used to denote Tulu Nadu and Kanyakumari which lie contiguous to Kerala on the southwestern coast of India, in addition to the modern state of Kerala. The people of Malabar were known as Malabars. Until the arrival of the East India Company, the term Malabar was used as a general name for Kerala, along with the term Kerala. From the time of Cosmas Indicopleustes (6th century CE) itself, the Arab sailors used to call Kerala as Male. The first element of the name, however, is attested already in the Topography written by Cosmas Indicopleustes. This mentions a pepper emporium called Male, which clearly gave its name to Malabar ('the country of Male'). The name Male is thought to come from the Malayalam word Mala ('hill'). Al-Biruni is the first known writer to call this country Malabar. Authors such as Ibn Khordadbeh and Al-Baladhuri mention Malabar ports in their works. The Arab writers had called this place Malibar, Manibar, Mulibar, and Munibar. Malabar is reminiscent of the word Malanad which means the land of hills. According to William Logan, the word Malabar comes from a combination of the Malayalam word Mala (hill) and the Persian/Arabic word Barr (country/continent).

History

Traditional sources 
According to the Sangam classic Purananuru, the Chera king Senkuttuvan conquered the lands between Kanyakumari and the Himalayas. Lacking worthy enemies, he besieged the sea by throwing his spear into it. According to the 17th-century Hindu mythology work Keralolpathi, the lands of Kerala were recovered from the sea by the axe-wielding warrior sage Parasurama, the sixth avatar of Vishnu (hence, Kerala is also called Parasurama Kshetram 'The Land of Parasurama' in Hindu mythology). Parasurama threw his axe across the sea, and the water receded as far as it reached. According to the legendary account, this new area of land extended from Gokarna to Kanyakumari. The land which rose from sea was filled with salt and unsuitable for habitation; so Parasurama invoked the Snake King Vasuki, who spat holy poison and converted the soil into fertile lush green land. Out of respect, Vasuki and all snakes were appointed as protectors and guardians of the land. P. T. Srinivasa Iyengar theorised, that Senguttuvan may have been inspired by the Parasurama legendary account, which was brought by early Aryan settlers.

Another much earlier Puranic character associated with Kerala is Mahabali, an Asura and a prototypical just king, who ruled the earth from Kerala. He won the war against the Devas, driving them into exile. The Devas pleaded before Lord Vishnu, who took his fifth incarnation as Vamana and pushed Mahabali down to netherworld to placate the Devas. There is a belief that, once a year during the Onam festival, Mahabali returns to Kerala. The Matsya Purana, among the oldest of the 18 Puranas, uses the Malaya Mountains of Kerala (and Tamil Nadu) as the setting for the story of Matsya, the first incarnation of Vishnu, and Manu, the first man and the king of the region.

Ophir

Ophir, a port or region mentioned in the Bible, famous for its wealth, is often identified with some coastal areas of Kerala. According to the account, the King Solomon received a cargo from Ophir every three years (1 Kings 10:22) which consisted of gold, silver, sandalwood, pearls, ivory, apes, and peacocks. A Dictionary of the Bible by Sir William Smith, published in 1863, notes the Hebrew word for parrot Thukki, derived from the Classical Tamil for peacock Thogkai and Cingalese Tokei, joins other Classical Tamil words for ivory, cotton-cloth and apes preserved in the Hebrew Bible. This theory of Ophir's location in Tamilakam is further supported by other historians. The most likely location on the coast of Kerala conjectured to be Ophir is Poovar in Thiruvananthapuram District (though some Indian scholars also suggest Beypore as possible location). The Books of Kings and Chronicles tell of a joint expedition to Ophir by King Solomon and the Tyrian king Hiram I from Ezion-Geber, a port on the Red Sea, that brought back large amounts of gold, precious stones and 'algum wood' and of a later failed expedition by king Jehoshaphat of Judah.  The famous 'gold of Ophir' is referenced in several other books of the Hebrew Bible.

Cheraman Perumals

The legend of Cheraman Perumals is the medieval tradition associated with the Cheraman Perumals (literally the Chera kings) of Kerala. The validity of the legend as a source of history once generated much debate among South Indian historians. The legend was used by Kerala chiefdoms for the legitimation of their rule (most of the major chiefly houses in medieval Kerala traced its origin back to the legendary allocation by the Perumal). According to the legend, Rayar, the overlord of the Cheraman Perumal in a country east of the Ghats, invaded Kerala during the rule of the last Perumal. To drive back the invading forces the Perumal summoned the militia of his chieftains (like Udaya Varman Kolathiri, Manichchan, and Vikkiran of Eranad). The Cheraman Perumal was assured by the Eradis (chief of Eranad) that they would take a fort established by the Rayar. The battle lasted for three days and the Rayar eventually evacuated his fort (and it was seized by the Perumal's troops). Then the last Cheraman Perumal divided Kerala or Chera kingdom among his chieftains and disappeared mysteriously. The Kerala people never more heard any tidings of him. The Eradis of Nediyiruppu, who later came to be known as the Zamorins of Kozhikode, who were left out in cold during allocation of the land, was granted the Cheraman Perumal sword (with the permission to "die, and kill, and seize").

According to the Cheraman Juma Mosque and some other narratives, "Once a Cheraman Perumal probably named Ravi Varma was walking with his queen in the palace, when he witnessed the splitting of the moon. Shocked by this, he asked his astronomers to note down the exact time of the splitting. Then, when some Arab merchants visited his palace, he asked them about this incident. Their answers led the King to Mecca, where he met Islamic prophet Muhammad and converted to Islam. It is assumed that the first recorded version of this legend is an Arabic manuscript of anonymous authorship known as Qissat Shakarwati Farmad. The 16th century Arabic work Tuhfat Ul Mujahideen authored by Zainuddin Makhdoom II of Ponnani, as well as the medieval Malayalam work Keralolpathi, also mention about the departure of last Cheraman Perumal of Kerala into Mecca.

However, S. N. Sadasivan contends in A Social History of India that Kalimanja, the king of the Maldives, was the one who converted to Islam. The story of Tajuddeen in the Cochin Gazetteer may have originated because Mali, as it was known to sailors at the time, was mistaken for Malabar (Kerala).

Pre-history

A substantial portion of Kerala including the western coastal lowlands and the plains of the midland may have been under the sea in ancient times. Marine fossils have been found in an area near Changanassery, thus supporting the hypothesis. Pre-historical archaeological findings include dolmens of the Neolithic era in the Marayur area of the Idukki district, which lie on the eastern highland made by Western Ghats. They are locally known as "muniyara", derived from muni (hermit or sage) and ara (dolmen). Rock engravings in the Edakkal Caves, in Wayanad date back to the Neolithic era around 6000 BCE. Archaeological studies have identified Mesolithic, Neolithic and Megalithic sites in Kerala. The studies point to the development of ancient Kerala society and its culture beginning from the Paleolithic Age, through the Mesolithic, Neolithic and Megalithic Ages. Foreign cultural contacts have assisted this cultural formation; historians suggest a possible relationship with Indus Valley civilization during the late Bronze Age and early Iron Age.

Ancient period

Kerala has been a major spice exporter since 3000 BCE, according to Sumerian records and it is still referred to as the "Garden of Spices" or as the "Spice Garden of India". Kerala's spices attracted ancient Arabs, Babylonians, Assyrians and Egyptians to the Malabar Coast in the 3rd and 2nd millennia BCE. Phoenicians established trade with Kerala during this period. Arabs and Phoenicians were the first to enter Malabar Coast to trade Spices. The Arabs on the coasts of Yemen, Oman, and the Persian Gulf, must have made the first long voyage to Kerala and other eastern countries. They must have brought the Cinnamon of Kerala to the Middle East. The Greek historian Herodotus (5th century BCE) records that in his time the cinnamon spice industry was monopolized by the Egyptians and the Phoenicians.

The Land of Keralaputra was one of the four independent kingdoms in southern India during Ashoka's time, the others being Chola, Pandya, and Satiyaputra. Scholars hold that Keralaputra is an alternate name of the Cheras, the first dominant dynasty who ruled Kerala, and had its capital at Karur. These territories once shared a common language and culture, within an area known as Tamilakam. The region around Coimbatore was ruled by the Cheras during Sangam period between 1st and the 4th centuries CE and it served as the eastern entrance to the Palakkad Gap, the principal trade route between the Malabar Coast and Tamil Nadu. Along with the Ay kingdom in the south and the Ezhimala kingdom in the north, the Cheras formed the ruling kingdoms of Kerala in the early years of the Common Era (CE). It is noted in Sangam literature that the Chera king Uthiyan Cheralathan ruled most of modern Kerala from his capital in Kuttanad, and controlled the port of Muziris, but its southern tip was in the kingdom of Pandyas, which had a trading port sometimes identified in ancient Western sources as Nelcynda (or Neacyndi) in Quilon. Tyndis was a major center of trade, next only to Muziris, between the Cheras and the Roman Empire. The lesser known Ays and Mushikas kingdoms lay to the south and north of the Chera regions, respectively. Pliny the Elder (1st century CE) states that the port of Tyndis was located at the northwestern border of Keprobotos (Chera dynasty). The North Malabar region, which lies north of the port at Tyndis, was ruled by the kingdom of Ezhimala during Sangam period. The port at Tyndis which was on the northern side of Muziris, as mentioned in Greco-Roman writings, was somewhere around Kozhikode. Its exact location is a matter of dispute. The suggested locations are Ponnani, Tanur, Beypore-Chaliyam-Kadalundi-Vallikkunnu, and Koyilandy.

According to the Periplus of the Erythraean Sea, a region known as Limyrike began at Naura and Tyndis. However the Ptolemy mentions only Tyndis as the Limyrike'''s starting point. The region probably ended at Kanyakumari; it thus roughly corresponds to the present-day Malabar Coast. The value of Rome's annual trade with the region was estimated at 50,000,000 sesterces. According to Pliny the Elder, goods from India were sold in the Empire at 100 times their original purchase price. Pliny the Elder mentioned that Limyrike was prone to raids by pirates. The Cosmas Indicopleustes mentioned that the Limyrike was a source of Malabar peppers.Das, Santosh Kumar (2006). The Economic History of Ancient India. Genesis Publishing Pvt Ltd. p. 301. In the last centuries BCE the coast became important to the Greeks and Romans for its spices, especially Malabar pepper. The Cheras had trading links with China, West Asia, Egypt, Greece, and the Roman Empire. In foreign-trade circles the region was known as Male or Malabar. Muziris, Tyndis, Naura, Nelcynda, and Barace, were among the principal ports at that time. Contemporary Sangam literature describes Roman ships coming to Muziris in Kerala, laden with gold to exchange for Malabar pepper. One of the earliest western traders to use the monsoon winds to reach Kerala was Eudoxus of Cyzicus, around 118 or 166 BCE, under the patronage of Ptolemy VIII, king of the Hellenistic Ptolemaic dynasty in Egypt. Roman establishments in the port cities of the region, such as a temple of Augustus and barracks for garrisoned Roman soldiers, are marked in the Tabula Peutingeriana, the only surviving map of the Roman cursus publicus.

Merchants from West Asia and Southern Europe established coastal posts and settlements in Kerala. The Israeli (Jewish) connection with Kerala started in 573 BCE. Arabs also had trade links with Kerala, starting before the 4th century BCE, as Herodotus (484–413 BCE) noted that goods brought by Arabs from Kerala were sold to the Israelis [Hebrew Jews] at Eden. In the 4th century, the Knanaya or Southist Christians also migrated from Persia and lived alongside the early Syriac Christian community known as the St. Thomas Christians who trace their origins to the evangelistic activity of Thomas the Apostle in the 1st century. Mappila was an honorific title that had been assigned to respected visitors from abroad; Israelite (Jewish), Syrian Christian, and Muslim immigration account for later names of the respective communities: Juda Mappilas, Muslim Mappilas, and Nasrani Mappilas. The earliest Saint Thomas Christian Churches, Cheraman Jumu'ah Masjid (traditionally dated to "629 CE" by the Mappilas)—regarded as "the first mosque of India"—and Paradesi Synagogue (1568 CE)—the oldest active synagogue in the Commonwealth of Nations—were built in Kerala.

Early medieval period

A second Chera Kingdom (c. 800–1102), also known as Kulasekhara dynasty of Mahodayapuram (present-day Kodungallur), was established by Kulasekhara Varman, which ruled over a territory comprising the whole of modern Kerala and a smaller part of modern Tamil Nadu. During the early part of the Kulasekara period, the southern region from Nagercoil to Thiruvalla was ruled by Ay kings, who lost their power in the 10th century, making the region a part of the Kulasekara empire. Under Kulasekhara rule, Kerala witnessed a developing period of art, literature, trade and the Bhakti movement of Hinduism. A Keralite identity, distinct from the Tamils, became linguistically separate during this period around the seventh century. The origin of Malayalam calendar dates back to year 825 CE. For local administration, the empire was divided into provinces under the rule of Naduvazhis, with each province comprising a number of Desams under the control of chieftains, called as Desavazhis. Mamankam festival, which was the largest native festival, was held at Tirunavaya near Kuttippuram, on the bank of river Bharathappuzha. Athavanad, the headquarters of Azhvanchery Thamprakkal, who were also considered as the supreme religious chief of the Nambudiri Brahmins of Kerala, is also located near Tirunavaya.

Sulaiman al-Tajir, a Persian merchant who visited Kerala during the reign of Sthanu Ravi Varma (9th century CE), records that there was extensive trade between Kerala and China at that time, based at the port of Kollam. A number of foreign accounts have mentioned about the presence of considerable Muslim population in the coastal towns. Arab writers such as Al-Masudi of Baghdad (896–956 CE), Muhammad al-Idrisi (1100–1165 CE), Abulfeda (1273–1331 CE), and Al-Dimashqi (1256–1327 CE) mention the Muslim communities in Kerala. Some historians assume that the Mappilas can be considered as the first native, settled Muslim community in South Asia. The known earliest mention about Muslims of Kerala is in the Quilon Syrian copper plates.

The inhibitions, caused by a series of Chera-Chola wars in the 11th century, resulted in the decline of foreign trade in Kerala ports. In addition, Portuguese invasions in the 15th century caused two major religions, Buddhism and Jainism, to disappear from the land. It is known that the Menons in the Malabar region of Kerala were originally strong believers of Jainism. The social system became fractured with divisions on caste lines. Finally, the Kulasekhara dynasty was subjugated in 1102 by the combined attack of Later Pandyas and Later Cholas. However, in the 14th century, Ravi Varma Kulashekhara (1299–1314) of the southern Venad kingdom was able to establish a short-lived supremacy over southern India.

The rise of Kozhikode
After his death, in the absence of a strong central power, the state was divided into thirty small warring principalities; the most powerful of them were the kingdom of Zamorin of Kozhikode in the north, Kollam in the far-south, Kochi in the south, and Kannur in the far north. The port at Kozhikode held the superior economic and political position in Kerala, while Kollam (Quilon), Kochi, and Kannur (Cannanore) were commercially confined to secondary roles. The Zamorin of Calicut was originally the ruler of Eranad, which was a minor principality located in the northern parts of present-day Malappuram district. The Zamorin allied with Arab and Chinese merchants and used most of the wealth from Kozhikode to develop his military power. Kozhikode became the most powerful kingdom in the Malayalam speaking region during the Middle Ages.K. V. Krishna Iyer, Zamorins of Calicut: From the earliest times to AD 1806. Calicut: Norman Printing Bureau, 1938. In the 14th century, Kozhikode conquered larger parts of central Kerala after the seize of Tirunavaya from Valluvanad, which were under the control of the king of Perumbadappu Swaroopam (Cochin). The ruler of Perumpadappu was forced to shift his capital (c. CE 1405) further south from Kodungallur to Kochi. In the 15th century, the status of Cochin was reduced to a vassal state of Kozhikode. The ruler of Kolathunadu (Kannur) had also came under the influence of Zamorin by the end of the 15th century.

At the peak of their reign, the Zamorins of Kozhikode ruled over a region from Kollam (Quilon) in the south to Panthalayini Kollam (Koyilandy) in the north. Ibn Battuta (1342–1347), who visited the city of Kozhikode six times, gives the earliest glimpses of life in the city. He describes Kozhikode as "one of the great ports of the district of Malabar" where "merchants of all parts of the world are found". The king of this place, he says, "shaves his chin just as the Haidari Fakeers of Rome do... The greater part of the Muslim merchants of this place are so wealthy that one of them can purchase the whole freightage of such vessels put here and fit-out others like them". Ma Huan (1403 AD), the Chinese sailor part of the Imperial Chinese fleet under Cheng Ho (Zheng He) states the city as a great emporium of trade frequented by merchants from around the world. He makes note of the 20 or 30 mosques built to cater to the religious needs of the Muslims, the unique system of calculation by the merchants using their fingers and toes (followed to this day), and the matrilineal system of succession (Marumakkathayam). Abdur Razzak (1442–43), Niccolò de' Conti (1445), Afanasy Nikitin (1468–74), Ludovico di Varthema (1503–1508), and Duarte Barbosa witnessed the city as one of the major trading centres in the Indian subcontinent where traders from different parts of the world could be seen.Gangadharan. M., The Land of Malabar: The Book of Barbosa (2000), Vol II, M.G University, Kottayam.

Vijayanagara Conquests
The king Deva Raya II (1424–1446) of the Vijayanagara Empire conquered the entirety of present-day state of Kerala in the 15th century. He defeated the Zamorin of Kozhikode, as well as the ruler of Kollam around 1443. Fernão Nunes says that the Zamorin had to pay tribute to the king of Vijayanagara Empire. Later Kozhikode and Venad seem to have rebelled against their Vijayanagara overlords, but Deva Raya II quelled the rebellion. As the Vijayanagara power diminished over the next fifty years, the Zamorin of Kozhikode again rose to prominence in Kerala. He built a fort at Ponnani in 1498.

Early modern period

The maritime spice trade monopoly in the Arabian Sea stayed with the Arabs during the High and Late Middle Ages. However, the dominance of Middle East traders was challenged in the European Age of Discovery. After Vasco Da Gama's arrival in Kappad Kozhikode in 1498, the Portuguese began to dominate eastern shipping, and the spice-trade in particular. Following the discovery of sea route from Europe to Malabar in 1498, the Portuguese began to expand their territories and ruled the seas between Ormus and the Malabar Coast and south to Ceylon. They established a trading center at Tangasseri in Quilon during 1502 as per the invitation of the then Queen of Quilon to start spices trade from there. The Zamorin of Kozhikode permitted the new visitors to trade with his subjects such that Portuguese trade in Kozhikode prospered with the establishment of a factory and a fort. However, Portuguese attacks on Arab properties in his jurisdiction provoked the Zamorin and led to conflicts between them.

The ruler of the Kingdom of Tanur, who was a vassal to the Zamorin of Calicut, sided with the Portuguese, against his overlord at Kozhikode. As a result, the Kingdom of Tanur (Vettathunadu) became one of the earliest Portuguese Colonies in India. The ruler of Tanur also sided with Cochin. Many of the members of the royal family of Cochin in 16th and 17th centuries were selected from Vettom. However, the Tanur forces under the king fought for the Zamorin of Calicut in the Battle of Cochin (1504). However, the allegiance of the Mappila merchants in Tanur region still stayed under the Zamorin of Calicut.

The Portuguese took advantage of the rivalry between the Zamorin and the King of Kochi allied with Kochi. When Francisco de Almeida was appointed as Viceroy of Portuguese India in 1505, his headquarters was established at Fort Kochi (Fort Emmanuel) rather than in Kozhikode. During his reign, the Portuguese managed to dominate relations with Kochi and established a few fortresses on the Malabar Coast. Fort St Angelo or St. Angelo Fort was built at Kannur in 1505 and Fort St Thomas was built at Kollam (Quilon) in 1518 by the Portuguese. However, the Portuguese suffered setbacks from attacks by Zamorin forces in South Malabar; especially from naval attacks under the leadership of Kozhikode admirals known as Kunjali Marakkars, which compelled them to seek a treaty. The Kunjali Marakkars are credited with organizing the first naval defense of the Indian coast. Tuhfat Ul Mujahideen written by Zainuddin Makhdoom II (born around 1532) of Ponnani in 16th-century CE is the first-ever known book fully based on the history of Kerala, written by a Keralite.A G Noorani. Islam in Kerala.
 Books  It is written in Arabic and contains pieces of information about the resistance put up by the navy of Kunjali Marakkar alongside the Zamorin of Calicut from 1498 to 1583 against Portuguese attempts to colonize Malabar coast. Thunchaththu Ezhuthachan, who is considered as the father of modern Malayalam literature, was born at Tirur (Vettathunadu) during Portuguese period.

In 1571, the Portuguese were defeated by the Zamorin forces in the battle at Chaliyam Fort. An insurrection at the Port of Quilon between the Arabs and the Portuguese led to the end of the Portuguese era in Quilon. The Muslim line of Ali Rajas of Arakkal kingdom, near Kannur, who were the vassals of the Kolathiri, ruled over the Lakshadweep islands. The Bekal Fort near Kasaragod, which is also largest fort in the state, was built in 1650 by Shivappa Nayaka of Keladi.

In 1602, the Zamorin sent messages to Aceh promising the Dutch a fort at Kozhikode if they would come and trade there. Two factors, Hans de Wolff and Lafer, were sent on an Asian ship from Aceh, but the two were captured by the chief of Tanur, and handed over to the Portuguese. A Dutch fleet under Admiral Steven van der Hagen arrived at Kozhikode in November 1604. It marked the beginning of the Dutch presence in Kerala and they concluded a treaty with Kozhikode on 11 November 1604, which was also the first treaty that the Dutch East India Company made with an Indian ruler. By this time the kingdom and the port of Kozhikode was much reduced in importance. The treaty provided for a mutual alliance between the two to expel the Portuguese from Malabar. In return the Dutch East India Company was given facilities for trade at Kozhikode and Ponnani, including spacious storehouses.

The Portuguese were ousted by the Dutch East India Company, who during the conflicts between the Kozhikode and the Kochi, gained control of the trade. They lost to Dutch at Quilon after 1661 and later, the Portuguese left south-western coast. The arrival of British on Malabar Coast can be traced back to the year 1615, when a group under the leadership of Captain William Keeling arrived at Kozhikode, using three ships. It was in these ships that Sir Thomas Roe went to visit Jahangir, the fourth Mughal emperor, as British envoy. In 1664, the municipality of Fort Kochi was established by Dutch Malabar, making it the first municipality in the Indian subcontinent, which got dissolved when the Dutch authority got weaker in the 18th century. 

The Kingdoms of Travancore and Cochin, and British influences
The Dutch in turn were weakened by constant battles with Marthanda Varma of the Travancore Royal Family, and were defeated at the Battle of Colachel in 1741. An agreement, known as "Treaty of Mavelikkara", was signed by the Dutch and Travancore in 1753, according to which the Dutch were compelled to detach from all political involvement in the region. In the 18th Century, Travancore King Sree Anizham Thirunal Marthanda Varma annexed all the kingdoms up to Cochin through military conquests, resulting in the rise of Travancore to pre-eminence in Kerala. The Kochi ruler sued for peace with Anizham Thirunal and the northern and north-central parts of Kerala (Malabar District), along with Fort Kochi, Tangasseri, and Anchuthengu in southern Kerala, came under direct British rule until India became independent. Travancore became the dominant state in Kerala by defeating the powerful Zamorin of Kozhikode in the battle of Purakkad in 1755.

The island of Dharmadom near Kannur, along with Thalassery, was ceded to the East India Company in 1734, which were claimed by all of the Kolattu Rajas, Kottayam Rajas, and Arakkal Bibi in the late medieval period, where the British initiated a factory and English settlement following the cession. In 1761, the British captured Mahé, and the settlement was handed over to the ruler of Kadathanadu. The British restored Mahé to the French as a part of the 1763 Treaty of Paris. In 1779, the Anglo-French war broke out, resulting in the French loss of Mahé. In 1783, the British agreed to restore to the French their settlements in India, and Mahé was handed over to the French in 1785.

In 1757, to resist the invasion of the Zamorin of Kozhikode, the Palakkad Raja sought the help of the Hyder Ali of Mysore. In 1766, Hyder Ali defeated the Zamorin of Kozhikode – an East India Company ally at the time – and absorbed Kozhikode into his state. The smaller princely states in northern and north-central parts of Kerala (Malabar region) including Kolathunadu, Kottayam, Kadathanadu, Kozhikode, Tanur, Valluvanad, and Palakkad were unified under the rulers of Mysore and were made a part of the larger Kingdom of Mysore. His son and successor, Tipu Sultan, launched campaigns against the expanding British East India Company, resulting in two of the four Anglo-Mysore Wars. Tipu ultimately ceded the Malabar District and South Kanara to the company in the 1790s as a result of the Third Anglo-Mysore War and the subsequent Treaty of Seringapatam; both were annexed to the Bombay Presidency (which had also included other regions in the western coast of India) of British India in the years 1792 and 1799, respectively. Later in 1800, both of the Malabar District and South Canara were separated from Bombay presidency to merge them with the neighbouring Madras Presidency. The company forged tributary alliances with Kochi in 1791 and Travancore in 1795.

By the end of the 18th century, the whole of Kerala fell under the control of the British, either administered directly or under suzerainty. Initially the British had to suffer local resistance against their rule under the leadership of Kerala Varma Pazhassi Raja, who had popular support in Thalassery-Wayanad region. The municipalities of Kozhikode, Palakkad, Fort Kochi, Kannur, and Thalassery, were founded on 1 November 1866 of the British Indian Empire, making them the first modern municipalities in the state of Kerala. The Malabar Special Police was formed by the colonial government in 1884 headquartered at Malappuram. British in Malabar also converted Thiyyar army, called as Thiyya pattalam into a special regiment centered at Thalassery called as The Thiyyar Regiment in 1904.Nagendra k.r.singh Global Encyclopedia of the South India Dalit's Ethnography (2006) page.230, Google Books There were major revolts in Kerala during the independence movement in the 20th century; most notable among them is the 1921 Malabar Rebellion and the social struggles in Travancore. In the Malabar Rebellion, Mappila Muslims of Malabar rebelled against the British Raj. The Battle of Pookkottur adorns an important role in the rebellion. Some social struggles against caste inequalities also erupted in the early decades of the 20th century, leading to the 1936 Temple Entry Proclamation that opened Hindu temples in Travancore to all castes.

As a state of the Republic of India
After India was partitioned in 1947 into India and Pakistan, Travancore and Kochi, part of the Union of India were merged on 1 July 1949 to form Travancore-Cochin. On 1 November 1956, the taluk of Kasargod in the South Kanara district of Madras, the Malabar district of Madras (excluding the islands of Lakshadweep), and Travancore-Cochin, without four southern taluks and Sengottai taluk (which joined Tamil Nadu), merged to form the state of Kerala under the States Reorganisation Act. A Communist-led government under E. M. S. Namboodiripad resulted from the first elections for the new Kerala Legislative Assembly in 1957. It was one of the earliest elected Communist governments anywhere. His government implemented land and educational reforms which in turn, reduced income inequality in the state.

Geography

The state is wedged between the Lakshadweep Sea and the Western Ghats. Lying between northern latitudes 8°18' and 12°48' and eastern longitudes 74°52' and 77°22', Kerala experiences humid tropical rainforest climate with some cyclones. Geographically, Kerala can be divided into three climatically distinct regions: the eastern highlands; rugged and cool mountainous terrain, the central mid-lands; rolling hills, and the western lowlands; coastal plains. Pre-Cambrian and Pleistocene geological formations compose the bulk of Kerala's terrain. A catastrophic flood in Kerala in 1341 CE drastically modified its terrain and consequently affected its history; it also created a natural harbour for spice transport.
The eastern region of Kerala consists of high mountains, gorges and deep-cut valleys immediately west of the Western Ghats' rain shadow. 41 of Kerala's west-flowing rivers, and 3 of its east-flowing ones originate in this region. The Western Ghats form a wall of mountains interrupted only near Palakkad; hence also known Palghat, where the Palakkad Gap breaks. The Western Ghats mountain chain is recognised as one of the world's eight "hottest hotspots" of biological diversity and is listed among UNESCO World Heritage Sites. The chain's forests are considered to be older than the Himalaya mountains. The Athirappilly Falls, which is situated on the background of Western Ghat mountain ranges, is also known as The Niagara of India. It is located in the Chalakudy River and is the largest waterfall in the state. Wayanad is the sole Plateau in Kerala. The eastern regions in the districts of Wayanad, Malappuram (Chaliyar valley at Nilambur), and Palakkad (Attappadi Valley), which together form parts of the Nilgiri Biosphere Reserve and a continuation of the Mysore Plateau, are known for natural Gold fields, along with the adjoining districts of Karnataka.

Kerala's western coastal belt is relatively flat compared to the eastern region, and is criss-crossed by a network of interconnected brackish canals, lakes, estuaries, and rivers known as the Kerala Backwaters. Kuttanad, also known as The Rice Bowl of Kerala, has the lowest altitude in India, and is also one of the few places in world where cultivation takes place below sea level. Around eight percent of India's waterways are found in Kerala. Many of the rivers are small and entirely fed by monsoon rain. As Kerala's rivers are small and lacking in delta, they are more prone to environmental effects. The rivers face problems such as sand mining and pollution. The state experiences several natural hazards like landslides, floods and droughts. The state was also affected by the 2004 Indian Ocean tsunami, and in 2018 received the worst flooding in nearly a century.

Climate
With around 120–140 rainy days per year, Kerala has a wet and maritime tropical climate influenced by the seasonal heavy rains of the southwest summer monsoon and northeast winter monsoon. Around 65% of the rainfall occurs from June to August corresponding to the Southwest monsoon, and the rest from September to December corresponding to Northeast monsoon. The moisture-laden winds of the Southwest monsoon, on reaching the southernmost point of the Indian Peninsula, because of its topography, divides into two branches; the "Arabian Sea Branch" and the "Bay of Bengal Branch". The "Arabian Sea Branch" of the Southwest monsoon first hits the Western Ghats, making Kerala the first state in India to receive rain from the Southwest monsoon. The distribution of pressure patterns is reversed in the Northeast monsoon, during this season the cold winds from North India pick up moisture from the Bay of Bengal and precipitate it on the east coast of peninsular India. In Kerala, the influence of the Northeast monsoon is seen in southern districts only. Kerala's rainfall averages 2,923 mm (115 in) annually. Some of Kerala's drier lowland regions average only 1,250 mm (49 in); the mountains of the eastern Idukki district receive more than 5,000 mm (197 in) of orographic precipitation: the highest in the state. In eastern Kerala, a drier tropical wet and dry climate prevails. During the summer, the state is prone to gale-force winds, storm surges, cyclone-related torrential downpours, occasional droughts, and rises in sea level. The mean daily temperature ranges from 19.8 °C to 36.7 °C. Mean annual temperatures range from 25.0 to 27.5 °C in the coastal lowlands to 20.0–22.5 °C in the eastern highlands.

Environment
Background radiation levels
Minerals including Ilmenite, Monazite, Thorium, and Titanium, are found in the coastal belt of Kerala. Kerala's coastal belt of Karunagappally is known for high background radiation from thorium-containing monazite sand. In some coastal panchayats, median outdoor radiation levels are more than 4 mGy/yr and, in certain locations on the coast, it is as high as 70 mGy/yr.

Flora and fauna

Most of the biodiversity is concentrated and protected in the Western Ghats. Three quarters of the land area of Kerala was under thick forest up to the 18th century. , over 25% of India's 15,000 plant species are in Kerala. Out of the 4,000 flowering plant species; 1,272 of which are endemic to Kerala, 900 are medicinal, and 159 are threatened. Its 9,400 km2 of forests include tropical wet evergreen and semi-evergreen forests (lower and middle elevations—3,470 km2), tropical moist and dry deciduous forests (mid-elevations—4,100 km2 and 100 km2, respectively), and montane subtropical and temperate (shola) forests (highest elevations—100 km2). Altogether, 24% of Kerala is forested. Four of the world's Ramsar Convention listed wetlands—Lake Sasthamkotta, Ashtamudi Lake, Thrissur-Ponnani Kole Wetlands, and the Vembanad-Kol wetlands—are in Kerala, as well as 1455.4 km2 of the vast Nilgiri Biosphere Reserve and 1828 km2 of the Agasthyamala Biosphere Reserve. Subjected to extensive clearing for cultivation in the 20th century, much of the remaining forest cover is now protected from clearfelling. Eastern Kerala's windward mountains shelter tropical moist forests and tropical dry forests, which are common in the Western Ghats. The world's oldest teak plantation 'Conolly's Plot' is in Nilambur.

Kerala's fauna are notable for their diversity and high rates of endemism: it includes 118 species of mammals (1 endemic), 500 species of birds, 189 species of freshwater fish, 173 species of reptiles (10 of them endemic), and 151 species of amphibians (36 endemic). These are threatened by extensive habitat destruction, including soil erosion, landslides, salinisation, and resource extraction. In the forests, sonokeling, Dalbergia latifolia, anjili, mullumurikku, Erythrina, and Cassia number among the more than 1,000 species of trees in Kerala. Other plants include bamboo, wild black pepper, wild cardamom, the calamus rattan palm, and aromatic vetiver grass, Vetiveria zizanioides. Indian elephant, Bengal tiger, Indian leopard, Nilgiri tahr, common palm civet, and grizzled giant squirrels are also found in the forests. Reptiles include the king cobra, viper, python, and mugger crocodile. Kerala's birds include the Malabar trogon, the great hornbill, Kerala laughingthrush, darter and southern hill myna. In the lakes, wetlands, and waterways, fish such as Kadu, Red Line Torpedo Barb and choottachi; orange chromide—Etroplus maculatus are found. Recently, a newly described tardigrade (water bears) species collected from Vadakara coast of Kerala named after Kerala State; Stygarctus keralensis.

Subdivisions

The state's 14 districts are distributed among six regions: North Malabar (far-north Kerala), South Malabar (north-central Kerala), Kochi (central Kerala), Northern Travancore, Central Travancore (southern Kerala) and Southern Travancore (far-south Kerala). The districts which serve as administrative regions for taxation purposes are further subdivided into 27 revenue subdivisions and 77 taluks, which have fiscal and administrative powers over settlements within their borders, including maintenance of local land records. Kerala's taluks are further sub-divided into 1,674 revenue villages.
Since the 73rd and 74th amendments to the Constitution of India, the local government institutions function as the third tier of government, which constitutes 14 District Panchayats, 152 Block Panchayats, 941 Grama Panchayats, 87 Municipalities, six Municipal Corporations and one Township.
The Kannur District surrounds Mahé on three sides with the Kozhikode District on the fourth.

In 1664, the municipality of Fort Kochi was established by Dutch Malabar, making it the first municipality in the Indian subcontinent, which got dissolved when the Dutch authority got weaker in the 18th century. The municipalities of Kozhikode, Palakkad, Fort Kochi, Kannur, and Thalassery, were founded on 1 November 1866 of the British Indian Empire, making them the first modern municipalities in the state of Kerala. The Municipality of Thiruvananthapuram came into existence in 1920. After two decades, during the reign of Sree Chithira Thirunal, Thiruvananthapuram Municipality was converted into Corporation on 30 October 1940, making it the oldest Municipal Corporation of Kerala. The first Municipal Corporation founded after the independence of India as well as the second-oldest Municipal Corporation of the state is at Kozhikode in the year 1962. There are six Municipal corporations in Kerala that govern Thiruvananthapuram, Kozhikode, Kochi, Kollam, Thrissur, and Kannur. The Thiruvananthapuram Municipal Corporation is the largest corporation in Kerala while Kochi metropolitan area named Kochi UA is the largest urban agglomeration. According to a survey by economics research firm Indicus Analytics in 2007, Thiruvananthapuram, Kozhikode, Kochi, Kollam, Thrissur are among the "best cities in India to live"; the survey used parameters such as health, education, environment, safety, public facilities and entertainment to rank the cities.

Government and administration

Kerala hosts two major political alliances: the United Democratic Front (UDF), led by the Indian National Congress; and the Left Democratic Front (LDF), led by the Communist Party of India (Marxist) (CPI(M)).  2021 Kerala Legislative Assembly election, the LDF is the ruling coalition; Pinarayi Vijayan of the Communist Party of India (Marxist) is the Chief Minister, while V. D. Satheesan of the Indian National Congress is the Leader of the Opposition. According to the Constitution of India, Kerala has a parliamentary system of representative democracy; universal suffrage is granted to residents. The government is organised into the three branches:

 Legislature: The unicameral legislature, the Kerala Legislative Assembly popularly known as Niyamasabha, comprises elected members and special office bearers; the Speaker and Deputy Speaker elected by the members from among themselves. Assembly meetings are presided over by the Speaker and in the Speaker's absence, by the Deputy Speaker. The state has 140 assembly constituencies. The state elects 20 and 9 members for representation in the Lok Sabha and the Rajya Sabha, respectively.
 Executive: The Governor of Kerala is the constitutional head of state, and is appointed by the President of India. Arif Mohammad Khan is the Governor of Kerala. The executive authority is headed by the Chief Minister of Kerala, who is the head of government and is vested with extensive executive powers; the head of the majority party in the Legislative Assembly is appointed to the post by the Governor. The Council of Ministers has its members appointed by the Governor, taking the advice of the Chief Minister. The executive administration is based in Thiruvananthapuram at State Secretariat complex. Each district has a district administrator appointed by government called District collector for executive administration. Auxiliary authorities known as panchayats, for which local body elections are regularly held, govern local affairs.
 Judiciary: The judiciary consists of the Kerala High Court and a system of lower courts. The High Court, located in Kochi, has a Chief Justice along with 35 permanent and twelve additional pro tempore justices . The high court also hears cases from the Union Territory of Lakshadweep.

The local government bodies; Panchayat, Municipalities and Corporations have existed in Kerala since 1959, however, the major initiative to decentralise the governance was started in 1993, conforming to the constitutional amendments of central government in this direction. With the enactment of Kerala Panchayati Raj Act and Kerala Municipality Act in 1994, the state implemented reforms in local self-governance. The Kerala Panchayati Raj Act envisages a 3-tier system of local government with Gram panchayat, Block panchayat and District Panchayat forming a hierarchy. The acts ensure a clear demarcation of power among these institutions. However, the Kerala Municipality Act envisages a single-tier system for urban areas, with the institution of municipality designed to par with the Gram panchayat of the former system. Substantial administrative, legal and financial powers are delegated to these bodies to ensure efficient decentralisation. As per the present norms, the state government devolves about 40% of the state plan outlay to the local government. Kerala was declared as the first digital state of India on 27 February 2016. The India Corruption Survey 2019 by Transparency International declared Kerala the least-corrupt state in India. The Public Affairs Index-2020 released by the Public Affairs Centre, India, designated Kerala as the best governed Indian state.

Economy

After independence, the state was managed as a democratic socialist welfare economy. From the 1990s, liberalisation of the mixed economy allowed Licence Raj restrictions against capitalism and foreign direct investment to be lightened, leading to economic expansion and an increase in employment. GSDP growth; 11.4% in 2018–2019 and 10.5% in 2017–2018 had been high compared to an average of 2.3% annually in the 1980s and between 5.1% and 6.0% in the 1990s. The state recorded 8.9% growth in enterprises from 1998 to 2005, higher than the national rate of 4.8%. The "Kerala phenomenon" or "Kerala model of development" of very high human development and in comparison low economic development has resulted from a strong service sector. In 2019–20, the tertiary sector contributed around 63% of the state's GSVA, compared to 28% by secondary sector, and 8% by primary sector. In the period between 1960 and 2020, Kerala's economy was gradually shifting from an agrarian economy into a service-based one.

The state's service sector which accounts for around 63% of its revenue is mainly based upon Hospitality industry, Tourism, Ayurveda & Medical Services, Pilgrimage, Information technology, Transportation, Financial sector, and Education. Major initiatives under the industrial sector include Cochin Shipyard, Shipbuilding, Oil refinery, Software Industry, Coastal mineral industries, food processing, marine products processing, and Rubber based products. The primary sector of the state is mainly based upon Cash crops. Kerala produces a significant amount of national output of the cash crops such as Coconut, Tea, Coffee, pepper, Natural rubber, Cardamom, and Cashew in India. The cultivation of food crops began to reduce since the 1950s. The Migrant labourers in Kerala are a significant workforce in its industrial and agricultural sectors. Being home to only 1.18% of the total land area of India and 2.75% of its population, Kerala contributes more than 4% to the Gross Domestic Product of India.

Kerala's economy depends significantly on emigrants working in foreign countries, mainly in the Arab states of the Persian Gulf, and the remittances annually contribute more than a fifth of GSDP. The state witnessed significant emigration during the Gulf Boom of the 1970s and early 1980s. In 2008, the Persian Gulf countries together had a Keralite population of more than 25 lakh(2.5 million), who sent home annually a sum of 6.81 billion, which is the highest among Indian states and more than 15.1% of remittances to India in 2008. In 2012, Kerala still received the highest remittances of all states: US$11.3 billion, which was nearly 16% of the US$71 billion remittances to the country. Malappuram district has the highest proportion of emigrant households in state. A study commissioned by the Kerala State Planning Board, suggested that the state look for other reliable sources of income, instead of relying on remittances to finance its expenditure.

A decline of about 300,000 in the number of emigrants from the state was recorded during the period between 2013 and 2018. According to a study done in 2013,  was the total amount paid to migrant labourers in the state every year. The tertiary sector comprises services such as transport, storage, communications, tourism, banking, insurance and real estate. In 2011–2012, it contributed 63.2% of the state's GDP, agriculture and allied sectors contributed 15.7%, while manufacturing, construction and utilities contributed 21.1%. Around 600 varieties of rice, which is Kerala's most used staple and cereal crop, are harvested from 3105.21 km2; a decline from 5883.4 km2 in 1990. 6,88,859 tonnes of rice are produced per year. Other key crops include coconut; 899,198 ha, tea, coffee; 23% of Indian production, or 57,000 tonnes, rubber, cashews, and spices—including pepper, cardamom, vanilla, cinnamon, and nutmeg.

As of March 2002, Kerala's banking sector comprised 3341 local branches: each branch served 10,000 people, lower than the national average of 16,000; the state has the third-highest bank penetration among Indian states. On 1 October 2011, Kerala became the first state in the country to have at least one banking facility in every village. Unemployment in 2007 was estimated at 9.4%; chronic issues are underemployment, low employability of youth, and a low female labour participation rate of only 13.5%, as was the practice of Nokku kooli, "wages for looking on". (On 30 April 2018, the Kerala state government issued an order to abolish Nokku Kooli, to take effect on 1 May.) By 1999–2000, the rural and urban poverty rates dropped to 10.0% and 9.6%, respectively.

The Grand Kerala Shopping Festival (GKSF) was started in 2007, covering more than 3000 outlets across the nine cities of Kerala with huge tax discounts, VAT refunds and huge array of prizes.  Lulu International Mall at Thiruvananthapuram is the largest Shopping Mall in India.

Its non-tax revenues (excluding the shares from Union tax pool) of the Government of Kerala reached  in 2020–2021. However, Kerala's high ratio of taxation to GSDP has not alleviated chronic budget deficits and unsustainable levels of government debt, which have impacted social services. Kerala's 10% rise in GDP is 3% more than the national GDP. In 2013, capital expenditure rose 30% compared to the national average of 5%, owners of two-wheelers rose by 35% compared to the national rate of 15%, and the teacher-pupil ratio rose 50% from 2:100 to 4:100.

The Kerala Infrastructure Investment Fund Board is a government owned financial institution in the state to mobilize funds for infrastructure development from outside the state revenue, aiming at overall infrastructure development of the state.
In November 2015, the Ministry of Urban Development selected seven cities of Kerala for a comprehensive development program known as the Atal Mission for Rejuvenation and Urban Transformation (AMRUT).

Despite of many achievements, Kerala facing many challenges like high levels of unemployment that disproportionately impact educated women, a high degree of global exposure and a very fragile environment.

Information Technology

Kerala has focused more attention towards growth of Information Technology sector with formation of Technopark, Thiruvananthapuram which is one of the largest IT employer in Kerala. It was the first technology park in India and with the inauguration of the Thejaswini complex on 22 February 2007, Technopark became the largest IT Park in India. Software giants like Infosys, Oracle, Tata Consultancy Services, Capgemini, HCL, UST Global, NeST and Suntec have offices in the state. The state has a second major IT hub, the Infopark centred in Kochi with "spokes"(it acts as the "hub") in Thrissur and Alleppy. , Infopark generates one-third of total IT Revenues of the state with key offices of IT majors like Tata Consultancy Services, Cognizant, Wipro, UST Global, IBS Software Services etc. and Multinational corporations like KPMG, Ernst & Young, EXL Service, Etisalat DB Telecom, Nielsen Audio, Xerox ACS, Tata ELXSI etc. Kochi also has another major project SmartCity under construction, built in partnership with Dubai Government. A third major IT Hub is under construction centred around Kozhikode known as Cyberpark. Kerala is the first Indian state to make Internet access a basic right. As of 2019, Kerala's Internet penetration rate is the second-highest in India only after to Delhi.

Industries
Traditional industries manufacturing items; coir, handlooms, and handicrafts employ around one million people. Kerala supplies 60% of the total global produce of white coir fibre. India's first coir factory was set up in Alleppey in 1859–60. The Central Coir Research Institute was established there in 1959. As per the 2006–2007 census by SIDBI, there are 14,68,104 micro, small and medium enterprises in Kerala employing 30,31,272 people. The KSIDC has promoted more than 650 medium and large manufacturing firms in Kerala, creating employment for 72,500 people. A mining sector of 0.3% of GSDP involves extraction of ilmenite, kaolin, bauxite, silica, quartz, rutile, zircon, and sillimanite. Other major sectors are tourism, medical sector, educational sector, banking, ship building, oil refinery, infrastructure, manufacturing, home gardens, animal husbandry and business process outsourcing.

Agriculture

The major change in agriculture in Kerala occurred in the 1970s when production of rice fell due to increased availability of rice all over India and decreased availability of labour. Consequently, investment in rice production decreased and a major portion of the land shifted to the cultivation of perennial tree crops and seasonal crops. Profitability of crops fell due to a shortage of farm labour, the high price of land, and the uneconomic size of operational holdings. Only 27.3% of the families in Kerala depend upon agriculture for their livelihood, which is also the least curresponding rate in India.

Kerala produces 97% of the national output of black pepper and accounts for 85% of the natural rubber in the country. Coconut, tea, coffee, cashew, and spices—including cardamom, vanilla, cinnamon, and nutmeg are the main agricultural products. Around 80% of India's export quality cashew kernels are prepared in Kollam. The key cash crop is Coconut and Kerala ranks first in the area of coconut cultivation in India. In 1960–61, about 70% of the Coconuts produced in India were from Kerala, which have reduced to 42% in 2011–12. Around 90% of the total Cardamom produced in India is from Kerala. India is the second-largest producer of Cardamom in world. About 20% of the total Coffee produced in India are from Kerala. The key agricultural staple is rice, with varieties grown in extensive paddy fields. Home gardens made up a significant portion of the agricultural sector. Related animal husbandry is touted by proponents as a means of alleviating rural poverty and unemployment among women, the marginalised, and the landless. The state government promotes these activities via educational campaigns and the development of new cattle breeds such as the Sunandini.
Though the contribution of the agricultural sector to the state economy was on the decline in 2012–13, through the strength of the allied livestock sector, it has picked up from 7.0% (2011–12) to 7.2%. In the 2013–14 fiscal period, the contribution has been estimated at a high of 7.8%. The total growth of the farm sector has recorded a 4.4% increase in 2012–13, over a 1.3% growth in the previous fiscal year. The agricultural sector has a share of 9.3% in the sectoral distribution of Gross State Domestic Product at Constant Price, while the secondary and tertiary sectors have contributed 23.9% and 66.7%, respectively.

There is a preference for organic products and home farming compared to synthetic fertilizers and pesticides. Forest gardens are common and known by the name home gardens. According to the English horticulturist Robert Hart, Kerala is "from the agroforestry point of view, perhaps the world's most advanced country, with an extraordinary intensivity of cultivation of some forest gardens."

Fisheries

With  of coastal belt, 400,000 hectares of inland water resources and approximately 220,000 active fishermen, Kerala is one of the leading producers of fish in India. According to 2003–04 reports, about 11 lakh(1.1 million) people earn their livelihood from fishing and allied activities such as drying, processing, packaging, exporting and transporting fisheries. The annual yield of the sector was estimated as 6,08,000 tons in 2003–04. This contributes to about 3% of the total economy of the state. In 2006, around 22% of the total Indian marine fishery yield was from Kerala. During the southwest monsoon, a suspended mud bank develops along the shore, which in turn leads to calm ocean water, peaking the output of the fishing industry. This phenomenon is locally called chakara. The waters provide a large variety of fish: pelagic species; 59%, demersal species; 23%, crustaceans, molluscs and others for 18%. Around 10.5 lakh(1.050 million) fishermen haul an annual catch of 668,000 tonnes as of a 1999–2000 estimate; 222 fishing villages are strung along the  coast. Another 113 fishing villages dot the hinterland.

Transportation
Roads

Kerala has  of roads, which accounts for 5.6% of India's total. Kottayam has the maximum length of roads among the districts of Kerala, while Wayanad accounts for minimum. Most of Kerala's west coast is accessible through the NH 66 (previously NH 17 and 47); and the eastern side is accessible through state highways. New projects for hill and coastal highways were recently announced under KIIFB. National Highway 66, with the longest stretch of road connects Kanyakumari to Mumbai; it enters Kerala via Talapady in Kasargod and passes through Kannur, Kozhikode, Malappuram, Guruvayur, Kochi, Alappuzha, Kollam, Thiruvananthapuram before entering Tamil Nadu. Palakkad district is generally referred to as the Gateway of Kerala, due to the presence of the Palakkad Gap in the Western Ghats, through which the northern (Malabar) and southern (Travancore) parts of Kerala are connected to the rest of India via road and rail. The state's largest checkpoint, Walayar, is on NH 544, in the border town between Kerala and Tamil Nadu, through which a large amount of public and commercial transportation reaches the northern and central districts of Kerala.

The Department of Public Works is responsible for maintaining and expanding the state highways system and major district roads. The Kerala State Transport Project (KSTP), which includes the GIS-based Road Information and Management Project (RIMS), is responsible for maintaining and expanding the state highways in Kerala. It also oversees a few major district roads. Traffic in Kerala has been growing at a rate of 10–11% every year, resulting in high traffic and pressure on the roads. Traffic density is nearly four times the national average, reflecting the state's high population. Kerala's annual total of road accidents is among the nation's highest. The accidents are mainly the result of the narrow roads and irresponsible driving. National Highways in Kerala are among the narrowest in the country and will remain so for the foreseeable future, as the state government has received an exemption that allows narrow national highways. The National Highways Authority of India (NHAI) has threatened the Kerala state government that it will give higher priority to other states in highway development since political commitment to better highways in Kerala has been lacking. , Kerala had the highest road accident rate in the country, with most fatal accidents taking place along the state's national highways.

Kerala State Road Transport Corporation

Kerala State Road Transport Corporation (KSRTC) is a state-owned road transport corporation. It is one of the country's oldest state-run public bus transport services. Its origins can be traced back to Travancore State Road Transport Department, when the Travancore government headed by Sri. Chithra Thirunnal decided to set up a public road transportation system in 1937.

The corporation is divided into three zones (North, Central and South), with the headquarters in Thiruvananthapuram (Kerala's capital city). At present the corporation has 5373 buses running on 4795 schedules.

The Kerala Urban Road Transport Corporation (KURTC) was formed under KSRTC in 2015 to manage affairs related to urban transportation. It was inaugurated on 12 April 2015 at Thevara.

Railways

Southern Railway zone of Indian Railways operates all railway lines in the state connecting most major towns and cities except those in the highland districts of Idukki and Wayanad. The railway network in the state is controlled by two out of six divisions of the Southern Railway; Thiruvananthapuram Railway division headquartered at Thiruvananthapuram and Palakkad Railway Division headquartered at Palakkad. Thiruvananthapuram Central (TVC) is the busiest railway station in the state. Kerala's major railway stations are:

The first railway line in the state was laid from Tirur to Chaliyam (Kozhikode), with the oldest Railway Station at Tirur, passing through Tanur, Parappanangadi, Vallikkunnu, and Kadalundi. The railway was extended from Tirur to Kuttippuram through Tirunavaya in the same year. It was again extended from Kuttippuram to Shoranur through Pattambi in 1862, resulting in the establishment of Shoranur Junction railway station, which is also the largest railway junction in the state. Major railway transport between Chaliyam–Tirur began on 12 March 1861, from Tirur-Shoranur in 1862, from Shoranur–Cochin Harbour section in 1902, from Kollam–Sengottai on 1 July 1904, Kollam–Thiruvananthapuram on 4 January 1918, from Nilambur-Shoranur in 1927, from Ernakulam–Kottayam in 1956, from Kottayam–Kollam in 1958, from Thiruvananthapuram–Kanyakumari in 1979 and from the Thrissur-Guruvayur Section in 1994. The Nilambur–Shoranur line is one of the shortest broad gauge railway lines in India. It was established in the British era for the transportation of Nilambur teaks and Angadipuram Laterite to United Kingdom through the port at Kozhikode. The presence of Palakkad Gap on Western Ghats makes the Shoranur Junction railway station important as it connects the southwestern coast of India (Mangalore) with the southeastern coast (Chennai).

Kochi Metro

Kochi Metro is the metro rail system in the city of Kochi. It is the only metro rail system in Kerala. The Kochi Metro uses 65-metre long Metropolis train sets built and designed by Alstom. It is the first metro system in India to use a communication-based train control (CBTC) system for signalling and telecommunication. In October 2017, Kochi Metro was named the "Best Urban Mobility Project" in India by the Urban Development Ministry, as part of the Urban Mobility India (UMI) International Conference hosted by the ministry every year.

Airports

Kerala has four international airports: 
Kollam Airport, established under the Madras Presidency, but since closed, was the first airport in Kerala. Kannur had an airstrip used for commercial aviation as early as 1935 when Tata airlines operated weekly flights between Mumbai and Thiruvananthapuram – stopping at Goa and Kannur. Trivandrum International Airport, managed by the Airport Authority of India, is among the oldest existing airports in South India. Calicut International Airport, which was opened in 1988, is the second-oldest existing airport in Kerala and the oldest in the Malabar region. Cochin International Airport is the busiest in the state and the seventh busiest in the country. It is also the first airport in the world to be fully powered by solar energy and has won the coveted Champion of the Earth award, the highest environmental honour instituted by the United Nations. Cochin International Airport is also the first Indian airport to be incorporated as a public limited company; it was funded by nearly 10,000 non-resident Indians from 30 countries.
Other than civilian airports, Kochi has a naval airport named INS Garuda. Thiruvananthapuram airport shares civilian facilities with the Southern Air Command of the Indian Air Force. These facilities are used mostly by central government VIPs visiting Kerala.

Water transport

Kerala has one major port, four intermediate ports, and 13 minor ports. The major port in the state is at Kochi, which has an area of 8.27 km2. The Vizhinjam International Seaport, which is currently classified as an intermediate port, is an upcoming major port under construction. Other intermediate ports include Beypore, Kollam, and Azheekal. The remaining ports are classified as minor which include Manjeshwaram, Kasaragod, Nileshwaram, Kannur, Thalassery, Vadakara, Ponnani, Munambam, Manakodam, Alappuzha, Kayamkulam, Neendakara, and Valiyathura. The Kerala Maritime Institute is headquartered at Neendakara, which has an additional subcentre at Kodungallur too. The state has numerous backwaters, which are used for commercial inland navigation. Transport services are mainly provided by country craft and passenger vessels. The main constraints to the expansion of inland navigation are; lack of depth in waterways caused by silting, lack of maintenance of navigation systems and bank protection, accelerated growth of the water hyacinth, lack of modern inland craft terminals, and lack of a cargo handling system.

The Conolly Canal, which is a part of West-Coast Canal, connects the city of Kozhikode with Kochi through Ponnani, passing through the districts of Malappuram and Thrissur. It begins at Vadakara. It was constructed in the year 1848 under the orders of then District collector of Malabar, H. V. Conolly, initially to facilitate movement of goods to Kallayi Port from hinter lands of Malabar through Kuttiady and Korapuzha river systems. It was the main waterway for the cargo movement between Kozhikode and Kochi through Ponnani, for more than a century. Other important waterways in Kerala include the Alappuzha-Changanassery Canal, Alappuzha-Kottayam-Athirampuzha Canal, and Kottayam-Vaikom Canal.

Demographics

Kerala is home to 2.8% of India's population; with a density of 859 persons per km2, its land is nearly three times as densely settled as the national average of 370 persons per km2. , Thiruvananthapuram is the most populous city in Kerala. In the state, the rate of population growth is India's lowest, and the decadal growth of 4.9% in 2011 is less than one third of the all-India average of 17.6%. Kerala's population more than doubled between 1951 and 1991 by adding 15.6 million people to reach 29.1 million residents in 1991; the population stood at 33.3 million by 2011. Kerala's coastal regions are the most densely settled with population of 2022 persons per km2, 2.5 times the overall population density of the state, 859 persons per km2, leaving the eastern hills and mountains comparatively sparsely populated. Kerala is the second-most urbanised major state in the country with 47.7% urban population according to the 2011 Census of India. Around 31.8 million Keralites are predominantly Malayali. The state's 321,000 indigenous tribal Adivasis, 1.1% of the population, are concentrated in the east.

Gender
There is a tradition of matrilineal inheritance in Kerala, where the mother is the head of the household. As a result, women in Kerala have had a much higher standing and influence in the society. This was common among certain influential castes and is a factor in the value placed on daughters. Christian missionaries also influenced Malayali women in that they started schools for girls from poor families. Opportunities for women such as education and gainful employment often translate into a lower birth rate, which in turn, make education and employment more likely to be accessible and more beneficial for women. This creates an upward spiral for both the women and children of the community that is passed on to future generations. According to the Human Development Report of 1996, Kerala's Gender Development Index was 597; higher than any other state of India. Factors, such as high rates of female literacy, education, work participation and life expectancy, along with favourable sex ratio, contributed to it.

Kerala's sex ratio of 1.084 (females to males) is higher than that of the rest of India and is the only state where women outnumber men. While having the opportunities that education affords them, such as political participation, keeping up to date with current events, reading religious texts etc., these tools have still not translated into full, equal rights for the women of Kerala. There is a general attitude that women must be restricted for their own benefit. In the state, despite the social progress, gender still influences social mobility.Antherjanam, Lalithambika. Cast Me Out If You Will. New York: The Feminist Press, 1997.

LGBT rights

Kerala has been at the forefront of LGBT issues in India. Kerala is one of the first states in India to form a welfare policy for the transgender community. In 2016, the Kerala government introduced free sex reassignment surgery through government hospitals. Queerala is one of the major LGBT organisations in Kerala. It campaigns for increased awareness of LGBT people and sensitisation concerning healthcare services, workplace policies and educational curriculum. Since 2010, Kerala Queer Pride has been held annually across various cities in Kerala.

In June 2019, the Kerala government passed a new order that members of the transgender community should not be referred to as the "third gender" or "other gender" in government communications. Instead, the term "transgender" should be used. Previously, the gender preferences provided in government forms and documents included male, female, and other/third gender.

In the 2021 Mathrubhumi Youth Manifesto Survey conducted on people aged between 15 and 35, majority (74.3%) of the respondents supported legislation for same-sex marriage while 25.7% opposed it.

Human Development Index

Under a democratic communist local government, Kerala has achieved a record of social development much more advanced than the Indian average. , Kerala has a Human Development Index (HDI) of 0.770, which is in the "high" category, ranking it first in the country. It was 0.790 in 2007–08 and it had a consumption-based HDI of 0.920, which is better than that of many developed countries. Comparatively higher spending by the government on primary level education, health care and the elimination of poverty from the 19th century onwards has helped the state maintain an exceptionally high HDI; the report was prepared by the central government's Institute of Applied Manpower Research. However, the Human Development Report 2005, prepared by Centre for Development Studies envisages a virtuous phase of inclusive development for the state since the advancement in human development had already started aiding the economic development of the state. Kerala is also widely regarded as the cleanest and healthiest state in India.

According to the 2011 census, Kerala has the highest literacy rate (94%) among Indian states. In 2018, the literacy rate was calculated to be 96%. In the Kottayam district, the literacy rate was 97%. The life expectancy in Kerala is 74 years, among the highest in India . Kerala's rural poverty rate fell from 59% (1973–1974) to 12% (1999–2010); the overall (urban and rural) rate fell 47% between the 1970s and 2000s against the 29% fall in overall poverty rate in India. By 1999–2000, the rural and urban poverty rates dropped to 10.0% and 9.6%, respectively. The 2013 Tendulkar Committee Report on poverty estimated that the percentages of the population living below the poverty line in rural and urban Kerala are 9.1% and 5.0%, respectively. These changes stem largely from efforts begun in the late 19th century by the kingdoms of Cochin and Travancore to boost social welfare. This focus was maintained by Kerala's post-independence government.

Kerala has undergone a "demographic transition" characteristic of such developed nations as Canada, Japan, and Norway;. as 11.2% of people are over the age of 60, and due to the low birthrate of 18 per 1,000. According to the 2011 census, Kerala had a total fertility rate (TFR) of 1.6. All district except Malappuram district had fertility rate below 2. Fertility rate is highest in Malappuram district (2.2) and lowest in Pathanamthitta district (1.3). In 2001, Muslims had the TFR of 2.6 as against 1.5 for Hindus and 1.7 for Christians. The state also is regarded as the "least corrupt Indian state" according to the surveys conducted by CMS Indian Corruption Study (CMS-ICS) Transparency International (2005) and India Today (1997). Kerala has the lowest homicide rate among Indian states, with 1.1 per 100,000 in 2011. In respect of female empowerment, some negative factors such as higher suicide rate, lower share of earned income, child marriage, complaints of sexual harassment and limited freedom are reported. The child marriage is lower in Kerala. The Malappuram district has the highest number of child marriage and the number of such cases are increasing in Malappuram. The child marriages are particularly higher among the Muslim community. In 2019, Kerala recorded the highest child sex abuse complaints in India.

In 2015, Kerala had the highest conviction rate of any state, over 77%. Kerala has the lowest proportion of homeless people in rural India, <0.1%, and the state is attempting to reach the goal of becoming the first "Zero Homeless State", in addition to its acclaimed "Zero landless project", with private organisations and the expatriate Malayali community funding projects for building homes for the homeless. The state was also among the lowest in the India State Hunger Index next only to Punjab. In 2015 Kerala became the first "complete digital state" by implementing e-governance initiatives.

Healthcare

Kerala is a pioneer in implementing the universal health care program. The sub-replacement fertility level and infant mortality rate are lower compared to those of other states, estimated from 12 to 14 deaths per 1,000 live births; as per the National Family Health Survey 2015–16, it has dropped to 6. According to a study commissioned by Lien Foundation, a Singapore-based philanthropic organisation, Kerala is considered to be the best place to die in India based on the state's provision of palliative care for patients with serious illnesses. However, Kerala's morbidity rate is higher than that of any other Indian state—118 (rural) and 88 (urban) per 1,000 people. The corresponding figures for all India were 55 and 54 per 1,000, respectively . Kerala's 13.3% prevalence of low birth weight is higher than that of many first world nations. Outbreaks of water-borne diseases such as diarrhoea, dysentery, hepatitis, and typhoid among the more than 50% of people who rely on 3 million water wells is an issue worsened by the lack of sewers. As of 2017, the state has the highest number of diabetes patients and also the highest prevalence rate of the disease in India.

The United Nations Children's Fund (UNICEF) and the World Health Organization designated Kerala the world's first "baby-friendly state" because of its effective promotion of breast-feeding over formulas. Over 95% of Keralite births are hospital delivered and the state also has the lowest infant mortality rate in the country. The third National Family Health Survey ranks Kerala first in "Institutional Delivery" with 100% births in medical facilities. Ayurveda, siddha, and endangered and endemic modes of traditional medicine, including kalari, marmachikitsa and vishavaidyam, are practised. Some occupational communities such as Kaniyar were known as native medicine men in relation to the practice of such streams of medical systems, apart from their traditional vocation. These propagate via gurukula discipleship, and comprise a fusion of both medicinal and alternative treatments. The Arya Vaidya Sala established by Vaidyaratnam P. S. Warrier at Kottakkal (about 10 km from Malappuram) in 1902, is the largest Ayurvedic medicinal network and health centre in the state. It is also one of the largest Ayurvedic medicinal brands in the world.

In 2014, Kerala became the first state in India to offer free cancer treatment to the poor, via a program called Sukrutham. People in Kerala experience elevated incidence of cancers, liver and kidney diseases. In April 2016, the Economic Times reported that 250,000 residents undergo treatment for cancer. It also reported that approximately 150 to 200 liver transplants are conducted in the region's hospitals annually. Approximately 42,000 cancer cases are reported in the region annually. This is believed to be an underestimate as private hospitals may not be reporting their figures. Long waiting lists for kidney donations has stimulated illegal trade in human kidneys, and prompted the establishment of the Kidney Federation of India which aims to support financially disadvantaged patients. As of 2017–18, there are 6,691 modern medicine institutions under the department of health services, of which the total bed strength is 37,843; 15,780 in rural areas and 22,063 in urban.

Language

Malayalam is the official language of Kerala, and one of the six Classical languages of India. There is a significant Tamil population in Idukki district, which accounts for 17.48% of its total population. Tulu and Kannada are spoken mainly in the northern parts of Kasaragod district, each of which account for 8.77% and 4.23% of total population in the district, respectively.

Religion

Kerala is very religiously diverse with Hindus, Muslims and Christians having a significant population throughout the state, Kerala is often regraded as one of the most diverse states in all of India. Hinduism is the most widely professed faith in Kerala, with significant Muslim and Christian minorities. In comparison with the rest of India, Kerala experiences relatively little sectarianism. According to 2011 Census of India figures, 54.7% of Kerala's residents are Hindus, 26.6% are Muslims, 18.4% are Christians, and the remaining 0.3% follow another religion or have no religious affiliation. Hindus represent the biggest religious group in all districts except Malappuram, where they are outnumbered by Muslims. Kerala has the largest population of Christians in India. As of 2016, Hindus, Muslims, Christians and others account for 41.9%, 42.6%, 15.4% and 0.2% of the total child births in the state, respectively.

The mythological legends regarding the origin of Kerala are Hindu in nature. Kerala produced several saints and movements. Adi Shankara was a religious philosopher who contributed to Hinduism and propagated the philosophy of Advaita. He was instrumental in establishing four mathas at Sringeri, Dwarka, Puri and Jyotirmath. Melpathur Narayana Bhattathiri was another religious figure who composed Narayaniyam, a collection of verses in praise of the Hindu God Krishna.

Islam arrived in Kerala, a part of the larger Indian Ocean rim, via spice and silk traders from the Middle East. Historians do not rule out the possibility of Islam being introduced to Kerala as early as the seventh century CE.Katz 2000; Koder 1973; Thomas Puthiakunnel 1973; David de Beth Hillel, 1832; Lord, James Henry 1977. Notable has been the occurrence of Cheraman Perumal Tajuddin, the mythical Hindu king that moved to Arabia to meet the Islamic Prophet Muhammad and converted to Islam. Kerala Muslims are generally referred to as the Mappilas. Mappilas are but one among the many communities that forms the Muslim population of Kerala. According to Qissat Shakarwati Farmad, the Masjids at Kodungallur, Kollam, Madayi, Barkur, Mangalore, Kasaragod, Kannur, Dharmadam, Panthalayini, and Chaliyam, were built during the era of Malik Dinar, and they are among the oldest Masjids in the Indian subcontinent. It is believed that Malik Dinar died at Thalangara in Kasaragod town. According to popular tradition, Islam was brought to Lakshadweep islands, on the western side of Kerala, by Ubaidullah in 661 CE. His grave is believed to be located on the island of Andrott. A few Umayyad (661–750 CE) coins were discovered from Kothamangalam in the eastern part of Ernakulam district.

According to some scholars, the Mappilas are the oldest settled Muslim community in South Asia.Miller, R. E. "Mappila" in The Encyclopedia of Islam Volume VI. Leiden E. J. Brill 1988 pp. 458–66  The monopoly of overseas spice trade from Malabar Coast was safe with the West Asian shipping magnates of Kerala ports. The Muslims were a major financial power to be reckoned within the kingdoms of Kerala and had great political influence in the Hindu royal courts. The Koyilandy Jumu'ah Mosque contains an Old Malayalam inscription written in a mixture of Vatteluttu and Grantha scripts which dates back to the 10th century CE. It is a rare surviving document recording patronage by a Kerala king to the Muslims of Kerala. A 13th century granite inscription, written in a mixture of Old Malayalam and Arabic, at Muchundi Mosque in Kozhikode mentions a donation by the king to the mosque. Travellers have recorded the considerably huge presence of Muslim merchants and settlements of sojourning traders in most of the ports of Kerala. Immigration, intermarriage and missionary activity/conversion—secured by the common interest in the spice trade—helped in this development. Most of the Muslims in Kerala follow the Shāfiʿī school of religious law (Samastha Kerala Jamiat-ul-Ulema) while a large minority follow movements that developed within Sunni Islam. The latter section consists of majority Salafists (Kerala Nadvathul Mujahideen). There is a large Keralan diaspora in the Middle East.

Ancient Christian tradition says that Christianity reached the shores of Kerala in 52 CE with the arrival of Thomas the Apostle, one of the Twelve Apostles of Jesus Christ.Menachery G; 1973, 1998; Mundalan, A. M; 1984; Podipara, Placid J. 1970; Leslie Brown, 1956 Saint Thomas Christians include Syro-Malabar Catholic, Syro-Malankara Catholic, Jacobite Syrian Christian Church, Mar Thoma Syrian Church, Malankara Orthodox Syrian Church, the Syrian Anglicans of the CSI and Pentecostal Saint Thomas Christians. The origin of the Latin Catholic Christians in Kerala is the result of the missionary endeavours of the Portuguese Padroado in the 16th century. As a consequence of centuries of mixing with colonial immigrants, beginning with the Portuguese, Dutch, French, British and other Europeans, there is a community of Anglo-Indians in Kerala of mixed European and Indian parentage or ancestry. Kerala has the highest population of Christians among all the states of India.

Judaism reached Kerala in the 10th century BCE during the time of King Solomon. They are called Cochin Jews or Malabar Jews and are the oldest group of Jews in India.Weil, Shalva. India's Jewish Heritage: Ritual, Art and Life-Cycle, Mumbai: Marg Publications, 2009. [first published in 2002; 3rd edn.]. Katz 200/* Religion */ 0; Koder 1973; Menachery 1998 There was a significant Jewish community which existed in Kerala until the 20th century, when most of them migrated to Israel. The Paradesi Synagogue at Kochi is the oldest synagogue in the Commonwealth. Jainism has a considerable following in the Wayanad district.

Buddhism was popular in the time of Ashoka but vanished by the 12th century CE. Certain Hindu communities such as the Samantan Kshatriyas, Ambalavasis, Nairs, Thiyyas and some Muslims around North Malabar used to follow a traditional matrilineal system known as marumakkathayam, although this practice ended in the years after Indian independence. Other Muslims, Christians, and some Hindu castes such as the Namboothiris, most of the Ambalavasi castes and the Ezhavas followed makkathayam, a patrilineal system. Owing to the former matrilineal system, women in Kerala enjoy a high social status. However, gender inequality among low caste men and women is reportedly higher compared to that in other castes.

Education

The Kerala school of astronomy and mathematics flourished between the 14th and 16th centuries. In attempting to solve astronomical problems, the Kerala school independently created a number of important mathematics concepts, including series expansion for trigonometric functions. The Kerala School of Astronomy and Mathematics was based at Vettathunadu (Tirur region). In the early decades of the 19th century, the modern educational transformation of Kerala was triggered by the efforts of the Church Mission Society missionaries to promote mass education. Following the recommendations of the Wood's despatch of 1854, the princely states of Travancore and Cochin launched mass education drives mainly based on castes and communities, and introduced a system of grant-in-aid to attract more private initiatives. The efforts by leaders such as Vaikunda Swami, Narayana Guru, Ayyankali, and Kuriakose Elias Chavara in aiding the socially discriminated castes in the state—with the help of community-based organisations like Nair Service Society, SNDP, Muslim Educational Society, Muslim Mahajana Sabha, Yoga Kshema Sabha (of Nambudiris) and congregations of Christian churches—led to the further development of mass education in Kerala.

According to the first economic census, conducted in 1977, 99.7% of the villages in Kerala had a primary school within , 98.6% had a middle school within  and 96.7% had a high school or higher secondary school within . In 1991, Kerala became the first state in India to be recognised as completely literate, although the effective literacy rate at that time was only 90%. In 2006–2007, the state topped the Education Development Index (EDI) of the 21 major states in India. , enrolment in elementary education was almost 100%; and, unlike other states in India, educational opportunity was almost equally distributed among sexes, social groups, and regions. According to the 2011 census, Kerala has a 93.9% literacy, compared to the national literacy rate of 74.0%. In January 2016, Kerala became the first Indian state to achieve 100% primary education through its Athulyam literacy programme.

The educational system prevailing in the state's schools specifies an initial 10-year course of study, which is divided into three stages: lower primary, upper primary, and secondary school—known as 4+3+3, which signifies the number of years for each stage. After the first 10 years of schooling, students typically enroll in Higher Secondary Schooling in one of the three major streams—liberal arts, commerce, or science. Upon completing the required coursework, students can enroll in general or professional undergraduate (UG) degree-college programmes. The majority of public schools are affiliated with the Kerala Board of Public Examination (KBPE). There are 15,892 schools under KBPE, of which 5,986 are government schools, 8,183 are aided schools, and the rest are either un-aided or technical schools. Other educational boards are the Indian Certificate of Secondary Education (ICSE), the Central Board for Secondary Education (CBSE), and the National Institute of Open Schooling (NIOS). English is the language of instruction in most self-financing schools, while government and government-aided schools offer instruction in English or Malayalam. Though the cost of education is generally considered low in Kerala, according to the 61st round of the National Sample Survey (2004–2005), per capita spending on education by the rural households was reported to be  for Kerala, more than twice the national average. The survey also revealed that the rural-urban difference in household expenditure on education was much less in Kerala than in the rest of India.

CMS College, Kottayam, established in 1817, is the first western-style college, and one of the oldest colleges, in India. Government Brennen College, Thalassery, founded by philanthropist Edward Brennen in 1862, and Government Victoria College, Palakkad, founded in 1866, are among the oldest educational institutions in India.

The KITE Kerala is a state owned special purpose company under education department of the Government of Kerala. It was developed to support ICT enabled education for schools in the state. The erstwhile IT@School Project was transformed into KITE for extending its scope of operations in August 2017. Kerala is the first Indian state to have ICT-enabled education with hi-tech classrooms in all public schools. Kerala topped in the School Education Quality Index published by NITI Aayog in 2019.

The Indian Naval Academy, located at Ezhimala, is Asia's largest, and the world's third-largest, naval academy.

Culture

The culture of Kerala is composite and cosmopolitan in nature and it is an integral part of Indian culture. It is a synthesis of Aryan, Dravidian, Arab, and European cultures, developed over millennia, under influences from other parts of India and abroad. It is defined by its antiquity and the organic continuity sustained by the Malayali people. It was elaborated through centuries of contact with neighbouring and overseas cultures. However, the geographical insularity of Kerala from the rest of the country has resulted in the development of a distinctive lifestyle, art, architecture, language, literature and social institutions. Over 10,000 festivals are celebrated in the state every year. The Malayalam calendar, a solar sidereal calendar started from 825 CE in Kerala, finds common usage in planning agricultural and religious activities. Malayalam, one of the classical languages in India, is Kerala's official language. Over a dozen other scheduled and unscheduled languages are also spoken. Kerala has the greatest consumption of alcohol in India.

Festivals

Many of the temples in Kerala hold festivals on specific days of the year. A common characteristic of these festivals is the hoisting of a holy flag which is brought down on the final day of the festival after immersing the deity. Some festivals include Poorams, the best known of these being the Thrissur Pooram. "Elephants, firework displays and huge crowds" are the major attractions of Thrissur Pooram. Other known festivals are Makaravilakku, Chinakkathoor Pooram, Attukal Pongala and Nenmara Vallangi Vela Other than these, festivals locally known as utsavams are conducted by many temples mostly on annual basis. Temples that can afford it will usually involve at least one richly caparisoned elephant as part of the festivities. The idol in the temple is taken out on a procession around the countryside atop this elephant. When the procession visits homes around the temple, people will usually present rice, coconuts, and other offerings to it. Processions often include traditional music such as Panchari melam or Panchavadyam. Eid al-Fitr and Eid al-Adha are celebrated by the Muslim community of the state while the festivals like Christmas and Easter are observed by the Christians.

Onam

Onam is a harvest festival celebrated by the people of Kerala and is reminiscent of the state's agrarian past. It is a local festival of Kerala consisting of a four-day public holidays; from Onam Eve (Uthradam) to the fourth Onam Day. Onam falls in the Malayalam month of Chingam (August–September) and marks the commemoration of the homecoming of King Mahabali. The total duration of Onam is 10 days and it is celebrated all across Kerala. It is one of the festivals celebrated with cultural elements such as Vallam Kali, Pulikali, Pookkalam, Thumbi Thullal and Onavillu.

Dance

Kerala is home to a number of performance arts. These include five classical dance forms: Kathakali, Mohiniyattam, Koodiyattom, Thullal and Krishnanattam, which originated and developed in the temple theatres during the classical period under the patronage of royal houses. Kerala natanam, Thirayattam, Kaliyattam, Theyyam, Koothu and Padayani are other dance forms associated with the temple culture of the region. Some traditional dance forms such as Oppana and Duffmuttu were popular among the Muslims of the state, while Margamkali and Parichamuttukali are popular among the Syrian Christians and Chavittu nadakom is popular among the Latin Christians.

Music

The development of classical music in Kerala is attributed to the contributions it received from the traditional performance arts associated with the temple culture of Kerala. The development of the indigenous classical music form, Sopana Sangeetham, illustrates the rich contribution that temple culture has made to the arts of Kerala. Carnatic music dominates Keralite traditional music. This was the result of Swathi Thirunal Rama Varma's popularisation of the genre in the 19th century. Raga-based renditions known as sopanam accompany kathakali performances. Melam; including the paandi and panchari variants, is a more percussive style of music: it is performed at Kshetram-centered festivals using the chenda. Panchavadyam is a form of percussion ensemble, in which artists use five types of percussion instrument. Kerala's visual arts range from traditional murals to the works of Raja Ravi Varma, the state's most renowned painter. Most of the castes and communities in Kerala have rich collections of folk songs and ballads associated with a variety of themes; Vadakkan Pattukal (Northern Ballads), Thekkan pattukal (Southern Ballads), Vanchi pattukal (Boat Songs), Mappila Pattukal (Muslim songs) and Pallipattukal (Church songs) are a few of them.

Cinema

Malayalam films carved a niche for themselves in the Indian film industry with the presentation of social themes. Directors from Kerala, like Adoor Gopalakrishnan, Mankada Ravi Varma, G. Aravindan, Bharathan, P. Padmarajan, M.T. Vasudevan Nair, K.G. George, Priyadarshan, John Abraham, Ramu Karyat, K S Sethumadhavan, A. Vincent and Shaji N Karun have made a considerable contribution to the Indian parallel cinema. Kerala has also given birth to numerous actors, such as Mohanlal, Mammootty, Satyan, Prem Nazir, Madhu, Sheela, Sharada, Miss Kumari, Jayan, Adoor Bhasi, Seema, Bharath Gopi, Thilakan, Vijaya Raghavan, Kalabhavan Mani, Indrans, Shobana, Nivin Pauly, Sreenivasan, Urvashi, Manju Warrier, Suresh Gopi, Jayaram, Murali, Shankaradi, Kavya Madhavan, Bhavana Menon, Prithviraj, Parvathy (actress), Jayasurya, Dulquer Salmaan, Oduvil Unnikrishnan, Jagathy Sreekumar, Nedumudi Venu, KPAC Lalitha, Innocent and Fahad Fazil. Late Malayalam actor Prem Nazir holds the world record for having acted as the protagonist of over 720 movies. Since the 1980s, actors Mohanlal and Mammootty have dominated the movie industry; Mohanlal has won five National Film Awards (four for acting), while Mammootty has three National Film Awards for acting. Malayalam Cinema has produced a few more notable personalities such as K.J. Yesudas, K.S. Chitra, M.G. Sreekumar, Vayalar Rama Varma, V. Madhusoodanan Nair, M.T. Vasudevan Nair and O.N.V. Kurup, the last two mentioned being recipients of Jnanpith award, the highest literary award in India. Resul Pookutty, who is from Kerala, is only the second Indian to win an academy award for sound design, for the breakthrough film Slumdog Millionaire. As of 2018, Malayalam cinema has got 14 awards for the best actor, 6 for the best actress, 11 for the best film, and 13 for the best film director in the National Film Awards, India.

Literature

The Sangam literature can be considered as the ancient predecessor of Malayalam. Malayalam literature starts from the Old Malayalam period (9th–13th century CE) and includes such notable writers as the 14th-century Niranam poets (Madhava Panikkar, Sankara Panikkar and Rama Panikkar), and the 16th-century poet Thunchaththu Ezhuthachan, whose works mark the dawn of both the modern Malayalam language and its poetry. For the first 600 years of Malayalam calendar, the literature mainly consisted of the oral Ballads such as Vadakkan Pattukal in North Malabar and Thekkan Pattukal in Southern Travancore. Designated a "Classical Language in India" in 2013, it developed into the current form mainly by the influence of the poets Cherusseri Namboothiri, Thunchaththu Ezhuthachan, and Poonthanam Nambudiri, in the 15th and the 16th centuries of Common Era.Freeman, Rich (2003). "Genre and Society: The Literary Culture of Premodern Kerala". In Literary Cultures in History: Reconstructions from South Asia Unnayi Variyar, a probable poet of the 17th/18th century CE, and Kunchan Nambiar, a poet of the 18th century CE, have also influenced a lot in the growth of modern Malayalam literature in its pre-mature form. The Bharathappuzha river, also known as River Ponnani, and its tributaries, have played a major role in the development of modern Malayalam Literature.

Paremmakkal Thoma Kathanar and Kerala Varma Valiakoi Thampuran are noted for their contribution to Malayalam prose. The "triumvirate of poets" (Kavithrayam): Kumaran Asan, Vallathol Narayana Menon, and Ulloor S. Parameswara Iyer, are recognised for moving Keralite poetry away from archaic sophistry and metaphysics, and towards a more lyrical mode. The poets like Moyinkutty Vaidyar and Pulikkottil Hyder have made notable contributions to the Mappila songs, which is a genre of the Arabi Malayalam literature.Pg 167, Mappila Muslims: a study on society and anti colonial struggles By Husain Raṇdathaṇi, Other Books, Kozhikode 2007 The first travelogue in any Indian language is the Malayalam Varthamanappusthakam, written by Paremmakkal Thoma Kathanar in 1785. The prose literature, Malayalam journalism, and criticism began after the latter-half of the 18th century. Contemporary Malayalam literature deals with social, political, and economic life context. The tendency of the modern literature is often towards political radicalism. Malayalam literature has been presented with 6 Jnanapith awards, the second-most for any Dravidian language and the third-highest for any Indian language. In the second half of the 20th century, Jnanpith winning poets and writers like G. Sankara Kurup, S. K. Pottekkatt, Thakazhi Sivasankara Pillai, M. T. Vasudevan Nair, O. N. V. Kurup, and Akkitham Achuthan Namboothiri, had made valuable contributions to the modern Malayalam literature. Later, writers like O. V. Vijayan, Kamaladas, M. Mukundan, Arundhati Roy, Vaikom Muhammed Basheer, have gained international recognition.

Cuisine

Kerala cuisine includes a wide variety of vegetarian and non-vegetarian dishes prepared using fish, poultry, and meat. Culinary spices have been cultivated in Kerala for millennia and they are characteristic of its cuisine. Rice is a dominant staple that is eaten at all times of day. A majority of the breakfast foods in Kerala are made out of rice, in one form or the other (idli, dosa, puttu, pathiri, appam, or idiyappam), tapioca preparations, or pulse-based vada. These may be accompanied by chutney, kadala, payasam, payar pappadam, appam, chicken curry, beef fry, egg masala and fish curry. Porotta and Biryani are also often found in restaurants in Kerala. Thalassery biryani is popular as an ethnic brand. Lunch dishes include rice and curry along with rasam, pulisherry and sambar. Sadhya is a vegetarian meal, which is served on a banana leaf and followed with a cup of payasam. Popular snacks include banana chips, yam crisps, tapioca chips, Achappam, Unni appam and kuzhalappam. Seafood specialties include karimeen, prawns, shrimp and other crustacean dishes.

Thalassery Cuisine is varied and is a blend of many influences.

Elephants
Elephants have been an integral part of the culture of the state. Almost all of the local festivals in Kerala include at least one richly caparisoned elephant. Kerala is home to the largest domesticated population of elephants in India—about 700 Indian elephants, owned by temples as well as individuals. These elephants are mainly employed for the processions and displays associated with festivals celebrated all around the state. More than 10,000 festivals are celebrated in the state annually and some animal lovers have sometimes raised concerns regarding the overwork of domesticated elephants during them. In Malayalam literature, elephants are referred to as the "sons of the sahya". The elephant is the state animal of Kerala and is featured on the emblem of the Government of Kerala.

Media

The media, telecommunications, broadcasting and cable services are regulated by the Telecom Regulatory Authority of India (TRAI). The National Family Health Survey – 4, conducted in 2015–16, ranked Kerala as the state with the highest media exposure in India. Dozens of newspapers are published in Kerala, in nine major languages, but principally Malayalam and English. Kerala has the highest media exposure in India. The most widely circulated Malayalam-language newspapers are Malayala Manorama, Mathrubhumi, Deshabhimani, Madhyamam, Kerala Kaumudi, Mangalam, Chandrika, Deepika, Janayugam, Janmabhumi, Siraj Daily and Suprabhaatham. Major Malayalam periodicals include Mathrubhumi Azhchappathippu, Vanitha, India Today Malayalam, Madhyamam Weekly, Grihalakshmi, Dhanam, Chithrabhumi and Bhashaposhini. The Hindu is the most read English language newspaper in the state, followed by The New Indian Express. Other dailies include Deccan Chronicle, The Times of India, DNA, The Economic Times and The Financial Express.

DD Malayalam is the state-owned television broadcaster. Multi system operators provide a mix of Malayalam, English, other Indian language and international channels. Some of the popular Malayalam television channels are Asianet, Asianet News, Asianet Plus, Asianet Movies, Surya TV, Surya Movies, Mazhavil Manorama, Manorama News, Kairali TV, Kairali News, Flowers, Media One TV, Mathrubhumi News, Kappa TV, Amrita TV, Reporter TV, Jaihind, Janam TV, Jeevan TV, Kaumudy TV and Shalom TV. With the second-highest internet penetration rate in India, Digital medias including Social medias and OTT services are a main source of information and entertainment in the state. Malayalam version of Google News was launched in September 2008. A sizeable People's science movement has taken root in the state, and such activities as writer's cooperatives are becoming increasingly common. BSNL, Airtel, Vodafone Idea Limited, Jio are the major cell phone service providers. Broadband Internet services are widely available throughout the state; some of the major ISPs are BSNL, Asianet Satellite Communications, Reliance Communications, Airtel, Vodafone Idea Limited, MTS, RailWire and VSNL. According to a TRAI report, as of June 2018 the total number of wireless phone subscribers in Kerala is about 43.1 million and the wireline subscriber base is at 1.9 million, accounting for the telephone density of 124.15. Unlike in many other states, the urban-rural divide is not visible in Kerala with respect to mobile phone penetration.

Sports

By the 21st century, almost all of the native sports and games from Kerala have either disappeared or become just an art form performed during local festivals; including Poorakkali, Padayani, Thalappandukali, Onathallu, Parichamuttukali, Velakali, and Kilithattukali. However, Kalaripayattu, regarded as "the mother of all martial arts in the world", is an exception and is practised as the indigenous martial sport. Another traditional sport of Kerala is the boat race, especially the race of Snake boats.

Cricket and football became popular in the state; both were introduced in Malabar during the British colonial period in the 19th century. Cricketers, like Tinu Yohannan, Abey Kuruvilla, Chundangapoyil Rizwan, Sreesanth, Sanju Samson and Basil Thampi found places in the national cricket team. A cricket franchise from Kerala, the Kochi Tuskers, played in the Indian Premier League's fourth season. However, this team was disbanded after the season because of conflicts of interest among its franchises. Kerala has only performed well recently in the Ranji Trophy cricket competition, in 2017–18 reaching the quarterfinals for the first time in history. Football is one of the most widely played and watched sports with huge in this state support for club and district level matches. Kochi hosts Kerala Blasters FC in the Indian Super League. The Blasters are one of the most widely supported clubs in the country as well as the fifth most followed football club from Asia in the social media. Also, Kozhikode hosts Gokulam Kerala FC in the I-League as well as the Sait Nagjee Football Tournament. Kerala is one of the major footballing states in India along with West Bengal and Goa and has produced national players like I. M. Vijayan, C. V. Pappachan, V. P. Sathyan, U. Sharaf Ali, Jo Paul Ancheri, Ashique Kuruniyan, Muhammad Rafi, Jiju Jacob, Mashoor Shereef, Pappachen Pradeep, C.K. Vineeth, Anas Edathodika, Sahal Abdul Samad, and Rino Anto. The Kerala state football team has won the Santhosh Trophy seven times; in 1973, 1992, 1993, 2001, 2004, 2018, and 2022. They were also the runners-up eight times.

Among the prominent athletes hailing from the state are P. T. Usha, Shiny Wilson and M.D. Valsamma, all three of whom are recipients of the Padma Shri as well as Arjuna Award, while K. M. Beenamol and Anju Bobby George are Rajiv Gandhi Khel Ratna and Arjuna Award winners. T. C. Yohannan, Suresh Babu, Sinimol Paulose, Angel Mary Joseph, Mercy Kuttan, K. Saramma, K. C. Rosakutty, Padmini Selvan and Tintu Luka are the other Arjuna Award winners from Kerala. Volleyball is another popular sport and is often played on makeshift courts on sandy beaches along the coast. Jimmy George was a notable Indian volleyball player, rated in his prime as among the world's ten best players. Other popular sports include badminton, basketball and kabaddi. The Indian Hockey team captain P. R. Shreejesh, ace goalkeeper hails from Kerala. International Walkers from the state include K. T. Irfan.

For the 2017 FIFA U-17 World Cup in India, the Jawaharlal Nehru Stadium (Kochi), was chosen as one of the six venues where the game would be hosted in India. Greenfield International Stadium at located at Kariavattom in Thiruvananthapuram city, is India's first DBOT (design, build, operate and transfer) model outdoor stadium and it has hosted international cricket matches and international football matches including 2015 SAFF Championship.

Tourism

Kerala's culture and traditions, coupled with its varied demographics, have made the state one of the most popular tourist destinations in India. In 2012, National Geographic's Traveller magazine named Kerala as one of the "ten paradises of the world" and "50 must see destinations of a lifetime". Travel and Leisure also described Kerala as "One of the 100 great trips for the 21st century". In 2012, it overtook the Taj Mahal to be the number one travel destination in Google's search trends for India. CNN Travel listed Kerala amongst its '19 best places to visit in 2019'. Kerala was named by TIME magazine in 2022 among the 50 extraordinary destinations to explore in its list of the World’s Greatest Places.

Kerala's beaches, backwaters, lakes, mountain ranges, waterfalls, ancient ports, palaces, religious institutions and wildlife sanctuaries are major attractions for both domestic and international tourists. The city of Kochi ranks first in the total number of international and domestic tourists in Kerala. Until the early 1980s, Kerala was a relatively unknown destination compared to other states in the country. In 1986 the government of Kerala declared tourism an important industry and it was the first state in India to do so. Marketing campaigns launched by the Kerala Tourism Development Corporation, the government agency that oversees the tourism prospects of the state, resulted in the growth of the tourism industry. Many advertisements branded Kerala with the tagline Kerala, God's Own Country. Kerala tourism is a global brand and regarded as one of the destinations with highest recall. In 2006, Kerala attracted 8.5 million tourists, an increase of 23.7% over the previous year, making the state one of the fastest-growing popular destinations in the world. In 2011, tourist inflow to Kerala crossed the 10-million mark.

Ayurvedic tourism has become very popular since the 1990s, and private agencies have played a notable role in tandem with the initiatives of the Tourism Department. Kerala is known for its ecotourism initiatives which include mountaineering, trekking and bird-watching programmes in the Western Ghats as the major activities. The state's tourism industry is a major contributor to the state's economy, growing at the rate of 13.3%. The revenue from tourism increased five-fold between 2001 and 2011 and crossed the  190 billion mark in 2011. According to the Economic Times Kerala netted a record revenue of INR 36,528.01 crore from the tourism sector in 2018, clocking an increase of Rs 2,874.33 crore from the previous year. Over 16.7 million tourists visited Kerala in 2018 as against 15.76 million the previous year, recording an increase of 5.9%. The industry provides employment to approximately 1.2 million people.

The state's only drive-in beach, Muzhappilangad in Kannur, which stretches across five kilometres of sand, was chosen by the BBC as one of the top six drive-in beaches in the world in 2016. Idukki Dam, the world's second arch dam, and Asia's first is at Idukki. The major beaches are at Kovalam, Varkala, Kozhikode, Fort Kochi, Cherai, Alappuzha, Ponnani, Kadalundi, Tanur, Chaliyam, Payyambalam, Kappad, Muzhappilangad and Bekal. Popular hill stations are at Ponmudi, Wayanad, Vagamon, Munnar, Peermade, Ramakkalmedu, Arimbra, Paithalmala of Kannur district, Kodikuthimala, and Nelliampathi. Munnar is 4,500 feet above sea level and is known for tea plantations, and a variety of flora and fauna. Kerala's ecotourism destinations include 12 wildlife sanctuaries and two national parks: Periyar Tiger Reserve, Parambikulam Wildlife Sanctuary, Chinnar Wildlife Sanctuary, Thattekad Bird Sanctuary, Wayanad Wildlife Sanctuary, Kadalundi Bird Sanctuary, Karimpuzha Wildlife Sanctuary, Muthanga Wildlife Sanctuary, Aralam Wildlife Sanctuary, Eravikulam National Park, and Silent Valley National Park are the most popular among them. The Kerala backwaters are an extensive network of interlocking rivers (41 west-flowing rivers), lakes, and canals that centre around Alleppey, Kumarakom, Ponnani, Nileshwaram, and Punnamada (where the annual Nehru Trophy Boat Race is held in August), Pathiramanal a small island in Muhamma. Padmanabhapuram Palace and the Mattancherry Palace are two nearby heritage sites. Padmanabhaswamy Temple in the state capital of Thiruvananthapuram holds the record as the wealthiest place of worship in the world, with assets of at least .

See also

 Outline of Kerala

 References 
 Citations 

 Sources 

 

Further reading

 Bose, Satheese Chandra and Varughese, Shiju Sam (eds.) 2015. Kerala Modernity: Ideas, Spaces and Practices in Transition''. Hyderabad: Orient Blackswan.

External links 

 Government
 The Official website of the Government of Kerala
 The Official website of Kerala Tourism

 General information
 
 

 
.
States and territories established in 1956
States and union territories of India